The competition took place again in 2009 with Ukraine joining Estonia and Latvia; the winners were Ukraine.

See also

References

External links

European rugby league competitions
2009 in rugby league